USS Sicily (CVE-118) was a  in the United States Navy. She was named in honor of the island of Sicily, which was the site of a major invasion during World War II. Sicily was laid down on 23 October 1944 by Todd-Pacific Shipyards, Tacoma, Washington, as Sandy Bay; launched on 14 April 1945; sponsored by Mrs. Julius Vanderwiele; renamed Sicily on 5 June 1945; and commissioned on 27 February 1946, Capt. B. W. Wright in command.

Operational history
 Sicily fitted out at Portland, Oregon, loaded supplies at Seattle, and then sailed for San Diego where she held shakedown training during April and May. On 15 May, she was ordered to proceed to New York City, via the Panama Canal and Norfolk, Virginia. The carrier entered the Brooklyn Navy Yard on 6 June and remained there until 30 September when she sailed to NS Argentia, Newfoundland, to conduct cold weather training.

During the remainder of 1946 and until 3 April 1950, Sicily operated with the U.S. Atlantic Fleet out of her home port of Norfolk. At that time, she was reassigned to the Pacific Fleet with San Diego as her home port, arriving there on 28 April. The carrier was scheduled to conduct antisubmarine warfare exercises during the summer, but the invasion of South Korea by the North Koreans, on 25 June, caused a radical change in her operating plans. Sicily was notified on 2 July that she was needed in the Far East; and she sailed, two days later, for the first of three deployments to Korean waters. Sicily was designated flagship of Carrier Division (CarDiv) 15 and on 3 August launched aircraft of VMF-214 on their first air strike in support of Allied ground forces. During this tour, she supported ground operations at Pohang, the Inchon landing, the advance to Seoul, and the withdrawal of the marines from the Chosin Reservoir to Hungnam before returning to San Diego on 5 February 1951. On her second tour with the 7th Fleet, from 13 May to 12 October 1951, Sicily operated on both the east and west coast of Korea. Her last tour during the Korean War was from 8 May to 4 December 1952, and she served with the United Nations Escort and Blockading Force. Sicily was deployed to the Far East again from 14 July 1953 to 25 February 1954.

Honors and awards
Sicily received five battle stars for service in the Korean War.

Decommissioning
Upon her return to the United States West Coast, Sicily was placed in reserve, out of commission, with the Pacific Reserve Fleet. She was struck from the Navy List on 1 July 1960 and sold to the Nicolai Joffe Corporation on 31 October 1960 for scrap.

Gallery

See also
 VS-931, antisubmarine squadron

References

 

Commencement Bay-class escort carriers
1945 ships
Cold War aircraft carriers of the United States
Korean War escort carriers of the United States
Korean War aircraft carriers of the United States